Kim Yoon-hye (born May 24, 1991) is a South Korean actress.

Career
Kim first appeared on a 2002 magazine cover of Vogue Girl Korea, and also modeled for MTV Asia in 2005 before starring in several music videos. She made her acting debut under the stage name Woori, which means "us" in Korean, making it difficult for her name to be searched on internet portals. She reverted to using her real name Kim Yoon-hye during the promotions for horror-comedy film Ghost Sweepers in 2012. Kim next starred in the TV dramas Heartstrings, I Need a Fairy (also known as Sent from Heaven),  and My Cute Guys. In 2013, she garnered positive reviews for her portrayal of a cold and aloof high school girl in romantic thriller Steel Cold Winter.

In September 2022, Kim signed with new agency J-Wide Company.

Filmography

Film

Television series

Web series

Variety show

Music video

Awards and nominations

References

External links
 Kim Yoon-hye Fan Cafe at Daum 
 
 
 

Living people
1991 births
South Korean television actresses
South Korean film actresses